Chengdu University (CDU) is a provincial-municipal public university in Chengdu, Sichuan. 

Chengdu University was founded in 1978. The university has 18 colleges with over 1,600 teachers and professors and more than 30,000 students.

Universities and colleges in Chengdu
Educational institutions established in 1978
1978 establishments in China